Matthew Seiyefa MNI (born 17 October 1960) was the acting Director General of the Nigerian State Security Service from 7 August 2018 till September 2018; he was appointed by Acting President, Prof. Yemi Osinbajo.

Background and education
He was born in October 1960 in Ekeremor in Bayelsa State,  southern Nigeria.  He received a bachelor's degree from University of Jos in 1982 and also trained at the National Institute for Policy and Strategic Studies, Kuru, Nigeria.

In 1984, Seiyefa joined the National Security Organization (NSO) which was later replaced in 1985 with the State Security Service (SSS). He eventually became Director of the Institute of Security Studies in Abuja

Director of the State Security Service 
On 7 August 2018, Acting President Yemi Osinbajo appointed Seiyefa as Acting Director General of the State Security Service following the sack of Lawal Musa Daura. On 14 September 2018, President Muhammadu Buhari removed Seiyefa replacing him with Yusuf Magaji Bichi.

References

1960 births
Living people
Directors General of the State Security Service (Nigeria)
Directors of the Nigerian State Security Service
University of Jos alumni
Nigerian security personnel
National Security Organization staff
Members of the Nigerian National Institute of Policy and Strategic Studies